Phil Powers is a wrestler.

Phil(ip) Powers may also refer to:

Phil Powers (baseball)
Phil Powers (climber)
Philip Powers, record producer

See also
Phil Power, football manager
Philip Power, chemist